Arjun Kumar Karki (born July 22, 1963) is a Nepali development practitioner who served as the Ambassador of Nepal to the United States from 2015 to 2021. As the residential ambassador of Nepal to the US, he also served as the non-residential ambassador to Panama, Costa Rica, Mexico, El Salvador, Honduras, and Guatemala

He graduated from Tribhuvan University with a B.Sc. in Agricultural Economics in 1990, and subsequently completed M.Sc. in Management and Implementation of Development Projects at the University of Manchester Institute of Science and Technology in 1995, and a PhD entitled "The Politics of Poverty and Movements from Below in Nepal" from the University of East Anglia in 2001. He has championed the cause of democracy in the country and has worked towards promotion of human rights and sustainable development.

He has been president of Rural Reconstruction Nepal since 1989, and the international co-ordinator of LDC Watch since 2004. In 2011, he was awarded the Justice and Peace Award by the Bishop Tji Hak-Soon Justice and Peace Foundation based in South Korea for his exceptional contribution for the protection of the human rights and the development of impoverished and marginalised communities in Nepal and in other LDCs.

References

External links
 Profile at the Embassy of Nepal in Washington DC
 

1963 births
Living people
Tribhuvan University alumni
Alumni of the University of Manchester Institute of Science and Technology
Alumni of the University of East Anglia
Nepalese diplomats
People from Sankhuwasabha District